Wade Hampton Frost (March 3, 1880 – May 1, 1938) was born in Marshall, Virginia. He was the son of a country doctor. Before college, he was first homeschooled by his mother, and then spent the final two years in boarding school. He received his B.A. in 1901 and his M.D. in 1903, both from the University of Virginia.

He was the first resident lecturer at the Johns Hopkins School of Hygiene and Public Health and was later professor of epidemiology. Frost served as Chair of the Department of Epidemiology from 1919 until 1938 and served as Dean of the School from 1931 until 1934. His work included studies of the epidemiology of poliomyelitis, influenza, diphtheria, and tuberculosis. In 1906, Frost assisted in the first successful arrest of a yellow fever epidemic in the United States. He also helped field investigations regarding typhoid outbreaks and water pollution by applying his knowledge of microbiology laboratory techniques. Frost's personal life is rarely touched on, but one of the presumed reasons that he focused on tuberculosis was because he was diagnosed with incipient pulmonary tuberculosis when he was in his thirties. He had to spend several months in a sanatorium when diagnosed. He is often considered the father of modern epidemiology. Frost's bibliography consists of 57 scientific publications.He died in Baltimore, Maryland on May 1, 1938, of esophageal cancer.

References

External links
 "A Guide to the Wade Hampton Frost Collection." Claude Moore Health Sciences Library, University of Virginia

1880 births
1938 deaths
University of Virginia alumni
Johns Hopkins University faculty
People from Marshall, Virginia
American public health doctors
University of Virginia School of Medicine alumni
Johns Hopkins Bloomberg School of Public Health
Members of the American Epidemiological Society